Howey is a Scottish surname and or a person, and may also refer to:

In other uses:
 Howey, a village in Disserth and Trecoed, Powys, Wales
 Howey-in-the-Hills, Florida, USA
 Howey House, historic home
 Howey Place, Melbourne